Crosstown may refer to:

Transportation 
 IND Crosstown Line, a subway line in New York, New York, United States
 Line 5 Eglinton, a light rail line in Toronto, Ontario, Canada, also known as "the Crosstown"
 MBTA crosstown bus routes, bus routes in and around Boston, Massachusetts, United States
 Minnesota State Highway 62 (east), referred to as "the Crosstown"
 A cross-city route (except in North American English)

Other 
 Crosstown, Missouri, an unincorporated community in Perry County, Missouri
 Crosstown, Ohio, an unincorporated community
 "Crosstown" (Glenn Miller song), a 1940 song recorded by Glenn Miller and His Orchestra on RCA Bluebird.
 Smart Crosstown, a concept car by Smart
 Crosstown Shootout, an annual college basketball game between the University of Cincinnati and Xavier University

See also 
 Crosstown Expressway (disambiguation)
 Crosstown Line (disambiguation)
 Crosstown traffic (disambiguation)